Uzbekistan competed at the 2002 Winter Olympics in Salt Lake City, United States.

Alpine skiing

Men

Women

Figure skating

Men

Women

Pairs

References
Official Olympic Reports
sports-reference

Nations at the 2002 Winter Olympics
2002
Winter Olympics